McAndrews-Gallaher House is a historic home located at Charleston, West Virginia.  It was built in 1914 for Frank J. McReynolds, Workers' Compensation Commissioner for West Virginia.  It is in the late Victorian farmhouse style.

It was listed on the National Register of Historic Places in 1984 as part of the South Hills Multiple Resource Area.

References

Houses in Charleston, West Virginia
Houses completed in 1914
Houses on the National Register of Historic Places in West Virginia
National Register of Historic Places in Charleston, West Virginia
Victorian architecture in West Virginia